The 2006 NCAA Rifle Championships were contested at the 27th annual NCAA-sanctioned competition to determine the team and individual national champions of co-ed collegiate rifle shooting in the United States. 

The championships were held at the Cadet Rifle Range at the United States Air Force Academy in Colorado Springs, Colorado.

Alaska won the team championship, the Nanooks' eighth NCAA national title in rifle.

Qualification
With only one national collegiate championship for rifle shooting, all NCAA rifle programs (whether from Division I, Division II, or Division III) were eligible. A total of nine teams contested this championship.

Results
Scoring:  The championship consisted of 60 shots for both smallbore and air rifle per team.

Team title
(DC) = Defending champions
Italics = Inaugural championship

Individual events

References

NCAA Rifle Championship
NCAA Rifle Championships
2006 in shooting sports
NCAA Rifle Championships